Trinity Episcopal Church is a historic Episcopal church located in Oshkosh, Wisconsin. The only Episcopal church in Oshkosh, Trinity is in the Diocese of Fond du Lac.  The congregation first met in 1850, organizing as Trinity Episcopal Church in 1854.  The current church building, which was constructed in 1887, is an example of Richardsonian Romanesque architecture. It was added to the National Register of Historic Places in 1974.

History 
Missionary priest Franklin R. Haff held the first Episcopal service in Oshkosh in 1850. The parish was briefly organized as St. Peter's parish, then reorganized as Trinity Episcopal Church in 1854, with David W. Tolford serving as first rector. The first church building was a wooden structure built and consecrated in 1857, and located at Algoma Boulevard and Division street. In 1887, the original building was razed, and the current stone structure, a Richardsonian Romanesque design by architect William Waters, was built on the same site.

References

External links
Official site 
The Diocese of Fond du Lac
The Episcopal Church
The Anglican Communion

Episcopal churches in Wisconsin
Buildings and structures in Oshkosh, Wisconsin
Churches on the National Register of Historic Places in Wisconsin
Richardsonian Romanesque architecture in Wisconsin
Romanesque Revival church buildings in Wisconsin
Churches in Winnebago County, Wisconsin
National Register of Historic Places in Winnebago County, Wisconsin
Churches completed in 1887